The Casco-class monitor was a unique class of light draft monitor built on behalf of the United States Navy for the Mississippi theatre during the American Civil War. The largest and most ambitious ironclad program of the war, the project was dogged by delays caused by bureaucratic meddling. Twenty ships of the class were eventually built at great expense, but proved so unseaworthy when trialed that they were quickly sidelined, causing a public scandal.

History

After the success of the US Navy's first monitor, in preventing the Confederate ironclad  from breaking the Union blockade at Hampton Roads in the spring of 1862, the navy became enthused with the monitor concept (at the expense of the larger broadside ironclad type), and ordered a number of new classes of monitor, one of which was the Casco class. The Cascos were a unique "light draft" class designed specifically for operating in the shallow bays, rivers, and inlets of the Confederacy.

The specifications for the Casco class originally called for a vessel with a light draft, not exceeding six feet, and a low freeboard to present the smallest possible target to Confederate guns. For the design of the new class, the Navy turned once again to John Ericsson, designer of USS Monitor. Ericsson came up with a design for a -long vessel with a single revolving turret containing two  guns, an armored upper deck, and twin screw propellers giving a top speed of around eight knots. Around the hull of the vessel, a large wooden "raft" was to be constructed, which would help increase buoyancy. Ericsson kept the design deliberately simple in keeping with the inexperience of the private shipyards which would be called upon to build them. He anticipated that each ship would take no more than forty days to complete.

The monitor office
At around the same time however, the Navy created a new "monitor office" to centralize oversight of the new monitor program. The new office, located across the hall from Ericsson's design bureau, was nominally headed by Rear Admiral Francis H. Gregory, but was effectively run by Chief Engineer Alban C. Stimers, to whom was entrusted the power of setting general plans and ship specifications. Stimers, an ambitious man, was keen to take credit for the design of the new monitors and frequently visited Ericsson's bureau to make changes to the specifications.

The greatest single alteration to the design however, came not directly from Stimers but from Admiral Joseph Smith, chief of the Bureau of Yards and Docks in Washington, D.C., who suggested that the oval hull of the ship be surrounded by large iron tanks which could be pumped full of water in order to lower the ship's freeboard still further when in combat to present an even smaller target, or drained for normal travel. Stimers liked the idea and ordered the changes, but when Ericsson saw the new plans he resigned from the project. The new plans greatly added to the design's complexity, requiring sophisticated pumping mechanisms, while the added weight would also reduce speed and buoyancy.

More design changes
In February 1863 the monitor office offered contracts for twenty of the new Casco-class monitors, in spite of the fact that the original architect, Ericsson, had not approved the new design. Winning bidders included prominent firms like Reaney, Son & Archbold in Chester, Pennsylvania, Wilcox & Whitney at Camden, Harlan & Hollingsworth in Wilmington, Delaware and Merrick & Sons of Philadelphia (the latter of whom subcontracted much of the work to William Cramp & Sons). A number of smaller firms were also contracted. The cost was estimated at $395,000 per ship, or approximately $8 million in total. Some shipyards, such as Cramp, were forced to substantially upgrade their ironworking facilities for the production of the new vessels.

By the end of 1863, frequent design changes were causing growing problems for the contractors. Stimers and his team of thirty draftsmen at the monitor office continued to submit changes even as the vessels were in the process of production, leading to long delays. One yard in Boston received a total of 83 drawings and 120 letters of explanation from Stimers, and the specification manual for the ships grew to 92 pages of small print. The final design called for a total of thirteen auxiliary engines and pumps per ship, fancy brasswork in place of cast iron, and a complex system of pipes for draining and filling the water tanks. The added weight to a ship designed with only a  freeboard at the outset raised questions about the ships' eventual seaworthiness.

Scandal and inquiry
By spring of 1864, the first of the Casco-class vessels, was ready for her initial trial. Putting to sea, waves washed across the deck, while the stern remained totally submerged by three or four inches (10 cm). Moreover, the trials were conducted "light", without the normal operational loads of coal, ammunition and stores. The ships were unseaworthy and virtually useless.

By this stage, the twenty vessels, in various stages of completion, had cost half a million dollars apiece. Amid public scandal, the Navy set up an inquiry. Stimers was found responsible and removed from his post, and the Navy appointed experienced administrators in his place. The vessels were redesigned and refitted in order to improve buoyancy, but few of them saw active service before the end of the war and those that did were decommissioned and laid up within months, while the majority were never commissioned at all. Within a few years, all the ships of the Casco class had been retired and scrapped or otherwise disposed of.

Ships

Footnotes

References

Heinrich, Thomas R. (1997): Ships for the Seven Seas: Philadelphia Shipbuilding in the Age of Industrial Capitalism, Johns Hopkins University Press, pp. 42–48.
 
Roberts, William H. (2002): Civil War Ironclads: Industrial Mobilization for the US Navy 1861–1865, Johns Hopkins University Press, 

 
Alban C. Stimers , DANFS. See also the individual ship entries for the class.

Monitor classes
 
Engineering failures